The Shek Sheung River (also known as River Sutlej), is a river in northern New Territories, Hong Kong. The river originates near Choi Po Court and Hong Kong Golf Club then flows beside the East Rail line before discharging into the Ng Tung River.

See also
List of rivers and nullahs in Hong Kong

References
2007. 2007 Hong Kong Map. Easy Finder Ltd.

External links
Rivers of Hong Kong, in Chinese

Rivers of Hong Kong
Sheung Shui